Liu Zunqi (1911-1993) was a Chinese writer, reporter, and editor-in-chief of China Daily.

1911 births
1993 deaths
Chinese editors
20th-century Chinese women writers
20th-century Chinese writers
Victims of the Anti-Rightist Campaign